Agyneta emertoni is a species of sheet weaver found in Canada. It was described by Roewer in 1942.

References

emertoni
Spiders of Canada
Spiders described in 1942